The Palaeodictyoptera are an extinct order of medium-sized to very large, primitive Palaeozoic paleopterous insects. They are informative about the evolution of wings in insects.

Overview
 
They were characterized by beak-like mouthparts, used to pierce plant tissues for feeding. There is a similarity between their fore- and hindwings, and an additional pair of winglets on the prothorax, in front of the first pair of wings. They are known as "six-winged insects" because of the presence of a pair of wings on each of the thoracic segments. Their winglets provide clues to the origins of the first insect wings. 

The mouthparts were elongated, and included sharp piercing stylets, and possibly a sucking pump-like organ. Unlike modern sucking insects, such as the Hemipterans, the mouthparts were held vertically below the head, or projected forwards. They probably used these organs to suck juices from plants, although some may have been ectoparasites, or predators.

Some types attained huge size. Another distinctive feature was the presence of unusually long cerci, about twice the length of the abdomen.

The Palaeodictyoptera are a paraphyletic assemblage of basal palaeodictyopteroidean insects, rather than a clade, because they gave rise to other insect orders. They range in time from the Middle Carboniferous (late Serpukhovian or early Bashkirian in age) to the late Permian.

References

External links
Paleodictyoptera at the Tree of Life project (list of taxa)

Further reading
 Carpenter, F. M. 1992. Superclass Hexapoda. Volume 3 of Part R, Arthropoda 4;  Treatise on Invertebrate Paleontology, Boulder, Colorado, Geological Society of America.
 

Carboniferous insects
Extinct insect orders
Permian insects
Pennsylvanian first appearances
Lopingian extinctions
Palaeodictyopteroidea